Retrospective 2 is a compilation album by American rock band Sevendust. It is a follow-up to the Retrospect DVD released in 2001. This album covers Next and Alpha, and does not contain any material from Animosity or Seasons. It also comes with a DVD which has the makings of the albums, Next and Alpha, as well as music videos and live performances.

Track listing

Bonus track listing

References

Sevendust albums
2007 greatest hits albums
2007 video albums
Music video compilation albums
Asylum Records compilation albums

Nu metal compilation albums